Resister is the third studio album by the Australian skate punk band The Decline, released on June 12, 2015 on the Pee Records label and distributed internationally by Bird Attack Records (United States), Finetunes (Europe) and Bells On Records (Japan). In support of the album, the band went on a worldwide tour, including the United States, Mexico, Japan, Europe and Australia.

Track listing

Personnel 
 Pat Decline – lead vocals, guitar
 Harry – drums
 Ben Elliott – lead vocals, guitar
 Ray Ray  – bass, backing vocal
 Adam Round - Producer, Mixer, Engineer
 Sam Allen - Producer, Mixer, Engineer
 Jason Livermore - Mastering
 Mark McEwen & Brody Simpson - Additional Editing
 Cam Baines (Australian punk band Bodyjar) - Guest Vocals in "I Don't Believe"

References 

2015 albums